This is a partial list of species in the genus Perdita.

Perdita species

References